This is a list of mayors of the 50 largest cities in the United States, ordered by their estimated populations as of the 2020 census. These 50 cities have a combined population of 49.6 million, or 15% of the national population. Louisville, Indianapolis, Jacksonville, Nashville, and Honolulu have consolidated city-county governments where the mayor is elected by residents of the entire county, not just that of the main city; in these cases the population and respective rank are for the county.

In some states, mayors are officially elected on a nonpartisan basis; however, their party affiliation or preference is generally known, and where it is known it is shown in the list below.

The breakdown of mayoral political parties is 36 Democrats, 11 Republicans, and 3 Independents (two elected with state Democratic support).

List

See also 
List of longest-serving mayors in the United States
List of United States cities by population
Mayoralty in the United States
United States Conference of Mayors

References

Cities
United States demography-related lists